Vivienne Newport (4 December 1951 − 27 April 2015) was an English dancer, choreographer and director of the . She founded the "Vivienne Newport company" in October 1981 in Frankfurt.

Life 
Newporta was born in Bristol. After studying dance in London, Newport received her further dance training at the Folkwang University of the Arts in Essen. There, the dancer, choreographer and dance teacher Kurt Jooss had established master classes in 1961, which later became the "Folkwang Ballet". In 1969, Pina Bausch succeeded Kurt Jooss as artistic director. At the beginning of the 1973/74 season, she took over the direction of the ballet of the Wuppertaler Bühnen. In 1973, Newport belonged to the first generation of dancers of the newly founded Tanztheater Wuppertal Pina Bausch alongside Malou Airaudo, Dominique Mercy, Tjitske Broersma and Gabriel Sala. The first piece had its premiere on 5 January 1974: Fritz, a dance evening by Pina Bausch with music by Gustav Mahler and Wolfgang Hufschmidt, coupled with "The Green Table" by Kurt Jooss and "Rodeo" by Agnes de Mille.

Newport died in Berlin at the age of 63.

Work

Dancer in pieces by Pina Bausch 
 1973: Fritz
 1974: Ich bring dich um die Ecke
 1974: Adagio
 1975: Orpheus und Eurydike
 1975: Frühlingsopfer
 1976: Die sieben Todsünden
 1977: Blaubart
 1977: Komm tanz mit mir
 1977: Renate wandert aus
 1978: Er nimmt sie an der Hand und führt sie in das Schloß, die anderen folgen
 1978: Kontakthof
 1978: Arien
 1980: 1980
 1981: Bandoneon

Choreographies 
 1982: Mist
Premiere Theater am Turm (TAT) Frankfurt on 15 January 1982 with four dancers and one actor, the American Coral Lebleboojian, the French Florence Bonnefont, the Irish Finola Cronin, the Algerian Mourad Beleksir and the German Lothar Kompenhans.
 1982: Behind the Barn, an Ox Overeats.
Oeuvre with texts, music and songs by Erik Satie, Sophie Tucker and Louis Armstrong. Premiere Theater am Turm (TAT) Frankfurt on 6 May 1982 with Coral Lebleboojian, Florence Bonnefont and Finola Cronin. On piano Peter Lamb.
 1982: Trigger
Premiere Theater am Turm (TAT) Frankfurt on 28 October 1982 with Uwe Wenzel, Jürgen Noll, Finola Cronin, Coral Lebleboojian, Florence Bonnefont and Lothar Kompenhans.
 1982: Damals (That Time). One-act play by Samuel Beckett.
Premiered as a dance theatre piece as part of the Beckett project of the Theater am Turm (TAT) Frankfurt on 10 December 1982 with Coral Lebleboojian, Finola Cronin, Jürgen Noll and Gerhart Hinze.
 1983: Persicaire
Premiere Theater am Turm (TAT) Frankfurt on 21 April 1983 with Florence Bonnefont, Finola Cronin, Lothar Kompenhans, Coral Lebleboojian, Jürgen Noll, Uwe Wenzel and Zazie de Paris.
 1983: Neither the Day nor the Hour
Premiere Theater am Turm (TAT) Frankfurt on 6 October 1983 with Finola Cronin, Florence Bonnefont, Coral Lebleboojian, Jürgen Noll and Uwe Wenzel. Film: Rüdiger Geissler
 1984: Drowning
Premiere Theater am Turm (TAT) Frankfurt on 6 April 1984 with Finola Cronin, Alexander Dombrowski, Armin Hauser, Coral Lebleboojian, Elfriede Müller, Jürgen Noll, Berna Uythof and Uwe Wenzel. Space: Alain Fressanges. Film: Rüdiger Geissler.
 1984: Disappearing with the Light
Premiere Theater am Turm (TAT) Frankfurt on 2 November 1984  with Florence Bonnefont, Armin Hauser, Coral Lebleboojian, Elfriede Müller, Jürgen Noll, Berna Uythof and Uwe Wenzel. Film: Rüdiger Geissler.
 1985: Scheiszegal
Premiere Theater am Turm (TAT) Frankfurt on 10 January 1985 with Florence Bonnefont, Finola Cronin, Berna Uythof, Coral Lebleboojian and Uwe Wenzel. With six songs (six sick songs) devised for the piece, written, composed by Chris Newman. On the piano: Stefan Schädler.
 1987: Elbestraße 17
Premiere Gallus Theater Frankfurt on 3 March 1987 Solo dance performance by Vivienne Newport.
 1987: Savannah
Premiere Gallus Theater Frankfurt on 1 October 1987 with Florence Bonnefont, Armin Hauser, Andreas Kühl, Elfriede Müller and Berna Uythof.
 1988: Beggars Folies and Savannah Beggar`s Follies premiered in Munich's Cafe Giesing (Konstantin Wecker's cafe) in Dec. 1988.Co-producer was the Munich gallery owner Rüdiger Schöttle.Film: Rüdiger Geissler
Gallus Theatre Frankfurt on 11 November 1988 with Florence Bonnefont, Armin Hauser, Elfriede Müller and Berna Uythof. A double evening.
 1992: Tooth for Tooth
UA Hochregallager der ehemaligen Adlerwerke Frankfurt on 6 November 1992 with Armin Dallapiccola, Ingrid Kerec, Kiri McGuigan and Udo Zickwolf. As part of the Kulturwochen Gallus an event by the Gallus Theater Frankfurt.
 1995: Hemlock
UA Entkernter Innenhof der ehemaligen Adlerwerke Frankfurt on 24 August 1995 with Toni Abbattista, Ingrid Kerec, Egmont Körner, Patricia Schmid, Namé Vaughn, Uwe Volkert and Yoshiko Waki. The audience looked out of the hollow windows of the third floor into the empty courtyard. An event of the Gallus Theatre Frankfurt.
 1997: Deep See Fishing
Premiere Neue Tiefgarage unter den Adlerwerken Frankfurt on 28 August 1997 with Toni Abbattista, Armin Dallapiccola, Ingrid Kerec, Hiekyoung Kim, Karin Lechner and Uwe Volkert. An event of the Gallus Theatre Frankfurt.
 1998: Distance
Premiere Gallus Theater in the Adlerwerke Frankfurt on 9 July 1998 with Armin Dallapiccola, Thomas Langkau, Karin Lechner, Uwe Volkert and Yoshiko Waki.
 2000: Not/Night/Not
Premiere Gallus Theater Frankfurt on 8 June 2000 with Armin Dallapiccola, Thomas Langkau, Karin Lechner and Uwe Volkert.
 2000: Cabaret Physique
Premiere Gallus Theater Frankfurt on 30 August 2000 with Florian Eckhardt, Thomas Langkau, Karin Lechner, Sabine Lindlar and Uwe Volkert.
 2002: n Blick in der Stadt
Premiere Berlin StaatsPOPerette in GRIPS Theater Berlin on 26 December 2002 by Eva Blum and Matthias Witting with Claudia Balko, Falk Berghofer, Eva Blum, Marie Cammin, Claudius Freyer, Christian Giese, Michaela Hanser, Bettina Theil.
 2003: Totentanz
 Motet by Hugo Distler for choir and speaker. Staged for the "Long Night at the Southwest Churchyard in Stahnsdorf" with members of the Company Vivienne Newport. Speakers: Karim Cherif, Peter Hahn, Thomas Langkau, Armin Dallapiccola, Anna Stock, Lisa Weber and Ruth Zschoche. Premiered on 30 August 2003.
 2005: Sehnsucht will träumen
premièred at the Staatstheater Kassel on 12 March 2005.
 2005: The hour when we knew nothing of each other. By Peter Handke. Production at the Staatstheater Kassel

References

External links 
 Seite zu Vivienne Newport beim Deutschen Tanzarchiv Köln.
 
 Vivienne Newport ist tot: Die Anziehungskraft der Schönheit. Artikel von Stefan Michalzik in der Frankfurter Rundschau online vom 28. April 2015
 Obituary of the Universität der Künste Berlin
 Obituary by Peter Hahn. http://friedenau-aktuell.de/index.über peterhahn/erinnerungen/vivienne-newport/

English dancers
British female dancers
Women choreographers
English choreographers
1951 births
2015 deaths
Artists from Bristol